The Nicolas-Claude NC-2 Aquilon was a single-seat touring aircraft built in the late 1930s, featuring a low-wing monoplane with canard foreplanes. The NC-2 was first flown on 5 April 1937 at Auxerre.

Specifications (NC-2 Aquilon)

References

1930s French civil utility aircraft
NC-2
Aircraft first flown in 1937